Jeanne, Baroness Brabants (25 January 1920 – 2 January 2014) was a Belgian dancer, choreographer and teacher.

Born in Antwerp, Brabants designed some 200 choreographies, worked with internationally recognized people and achieved numerous international awards.

Jeanne Brabants died on 2 January 2014, aged 93, in her hometown of Antwerp.

References

1920 births
2014 deaths
Entertainers from Antwerp
Belgian ballerinas
Belgian choreographers
Belgian educators